Wilhelm König (born in Vienna) was an Austrian archaeologist and painter.

A painter by profession, in 1931, König was elected assistant to the German leader of the Baghdad Antiquity Administration with the title of a "Direktor". At the excavation of a Parthian settlement in modern day Khujut Rabu (near Baghdad, Iraq), he discovered the alleged Baghdad Battery. In February 1939, he returned to Vienna, due to blood poisoning, where he published a book Im verlorenen Paradies. Neun Jahre Irak.

Controversy 
In March 2012, Professor Elizabeth Stone, of Stony Brook University, an expert on Iraqi archaeology, returning from one of the first archaeological expeditions in Iraq since 20 years, stated that she does not know a single archaeologist, who believed that this was a "real battery".

Works
Neun Jahre Irak Brünn, Münster, Wien 1940

Work

Plaster castings
The plaster castings of objects from the Iraq museum, which are exhibited in the "Vorderasiatisches Museum" in Berlin, were made by König.

Publications
 Ein galvanisches Element aus der Partherzeit? In: Forschungen und Fortschritte(de). Band 14, 1936, S. 8–9.
 Im verlorenen Paradies. Neun Jahre Irak. Rohrer, Baden bei Wien u. a. 1940 (Buchbesprechung von Käte Fück: König: Im verlorenen Paradies. Neun Jahre Irak. In: Zeitschrift der Deutschen Morgenländischen Gesellschaft. Band 95 [Neue Folge Band 20], Nr. 3/4, 1941, S. 441 f. [Digitalisat]).

Literature 
 Arnold Nöldeke(de): Briefe aus Uruk-Warka, 1931–1939. Hrsg. von Margarete van Ess(de) und Elisabeth Weber-Nöldeke. Reichert, Wiesbaden 2008, S. 331.
 Erich Zehren: Die biblischen Hügel: zur Geschichte der Archäeologie.Hrsg. von F. A. Herbig(de), 1961, S. 88, 124, 157, u.v.m. (Google Books)

References

External links
"The Baghdad battery" on The Unexplained Mysteries

Year of birth missing
Year of death missing
Archaeologists from Vienna
Directors of museums in Germany